José "Pepe" Cayuela Ruiz (born 8 October 1950) is a Spanish football manager.

Managerial career
Born in Fuengirola, Málaga, Andalusia, Cayuela made his managerial debut with CD San Félix, a club he already represented as a player. He subsequently spent two decades managing lower league clubs in his native region.

In the 1992 summer Cayuela was appointed UD Almería manager, after a stint at Vélez CF. He was also in charge of the Rojiblancos in two further occasions (1995 and 1996), achieving promotion from Segunda División B in one of them and narrowly avoiding relegation from Segunda División in the other.

In June 1996 Cayuela was named manager of Málaga CF in the third level, being dismissed only five months after. He was also appointed at the helm of Polideportivo Almería in 1997, but stepped down due to health issues.

References

External links

1950 births
Living people
People from Fuengirola
Sportspeople from the Province of Málaga
Spanish footballers
Footballers from Andalusia
Spanish football managers
Segunda División managers
CD El Palo managers
UD Almería managers
Málaga CF managers
Association footballers not categorized by position
CP Almería managers
CD Fuengirola managers
CD Los Boliches managers